Hugh MacLeod or McLeod may refer to:

Hugh McLeod (politician) (1843–1879), Scottish-born lawyer and political figure in Nova Scotia
Hugh MacLeod (politician) (1882–1955), Australian politician
Hugh McLeod (rugby union) (1932–2014), Scottish rugby player
Hugh McLeod (footballer) (1907–1929), Scottish amateur footballer
Hugh Magnus MacLeod of MacLeod (born 1973), British filmmaker and 30th Chief of Clan MacLeod
Hugh MacLeod (minister) (1730–1809), joint founder of the Royal Society of Edinburgh